Lorenzo Rota (born 23 May 1995) is an Italian racing cyclist, who rides for UCI WorldTeam .

Career
He rode at the 2014 UCI Road World Championships, and was named in the start list for the 2017 Giro d'Italia.

Intermarché–Wanty–Gobert Matériaux (2021–present)
In August 2020, it was announced that Rota would be joining the  team on an initial one-year contract for the 2021 season. In his first season at World Tour level, Rota took seven top-ten finishes in one-day races, with a best finish of fourth place at the Clásica de San Sebastián and the Giro della Toscana. In October 2021, it was announced that Rota had extended his contract with the team for a further two years.

Major results

2013
 5th Road race, UCI Junior Road World Championships
2015
 2nd Trofeo Alcide Degasperi
 3rd Trofeo Internazionale Bastianelli
 3rd Gran Premio di Poggiana
 6th Gran Premio Industrie del Marmo
 7th Overall Okolo Slovenska
 8th GP Laguna
 9th Coppa dei Laghi-Trofeo Almar
2017
 5th Overall Tour du Limousin
2019
 4th Coppa Agostoni
 8th Overall Istrian Spring Trophy
 10th Overall Tour of Slovenia
2020
 5th Trofeo Laigueglia
 6th Faun-Ardèche Classic
2021
 4th Clásica de San Sebastián
 4th Giro della Toscana
 5th Coppa Sabatini
 7th Tre Valli Varesine
 7th Coppa Ugo Agostoni
 7th Veneto Classic
 10th Trofeo Laigueglia
2022
 1st  Overall Sazka Tour
1st  Points classification
1st Stage 2
 2nd Road race, National Road Championships
 2nd Giro della Toscana
 2nd Polynormande
 4th Overall Tour of Belgium
 4th Overall Tour de Wallonie
 4th Trofeo Laigueglia
 4th Grand Prix of Aargau Canton
 5th Overall Tour du Limousin
 10th Clásica de San Sebastián
2023
 4th Trofeo Laigueglia
 7th Faun-Ardèche Classic
 7th Clásica Jaén Paraíso Interior
 8th Overall Vuelta a Andalucía

Grand Tour general classification results timeline

References

External links
 

1995 births
Living people
Italian male cyclists
Cyclists from Bergamo